Octene is an alkene with the formula . Several isomers of octene are known, depending on the position and the geometry of the double bond in the carbon chain. 

The simplest isomer is 1-octene, an alpha-olefin used primarily as a co-monomer in production of polyethylene via the solution polymerization process. Several useful structural isomers of the octenes are obtained by dimerization of isobutene and 1-butene. These branched alkenes are used to alkylate phenols to give precursors to detergents.

References

External links
OSHA Safety and Health Topics: 1-Octene

Alkenes
Monomers